Dionysiakos is a form of Greek dance and customs from ancient Greece.
Dionysiakos and its forms revived today in many areas of Greece like Peloponnese, central Greece and Crete with the best-known the Phallus festival in the  area of Tyrnavos, Larissa. 

It is a pagan fertility festival in honor of the god of Mount Olympus, Dionysus with customs and  activities based on the religion in ancient Greece and is one of the most famous worldwide.

See also
Greek music

References

External links
Διονυσιακός Χορός

Ancient Greek dances
Greek dances